Adelaide of Auxerre (1251–1290) was ruling Countess of Auxerre in 1262-1290. 

She was a daughter of Eudes of Burgundy and Mathildis II of Bourbon. In 1262 she succeeded her mother as Countess of Auxerre. In 1268 she married John I of Chalon, Lord of Rochefort, son of John – they had one child, William (died 1304). After her husband's death she married an Arab Muslim man.

References

1251 births
1290 deaths
French countesses
House of Burgundy
French suo jure nobility
Chalon-Arlay
13th-century women rulers